Penhallow v. Doane's Administrators, 3 U.S. (3 Dall.) 54 (1795), was a United States Supreme Court case about prize causes, holding that federal district courts have the powers formerly granted to the Court of Appeals in Cases of Capture under the Congress of the Articles of Confederation. In the case:
it was held that the Congress under the Confederation had power to erect a court of appeals in prize causes, that its decrees were conclusive, and that the district courts of the United States created under the Constitution have, as courts of admiralty, power to carry into effect the decrees of the former court of appeals in prize causes erected by the Congress of the Confederation.

References

United States Supreme Court cases
1795 in United States case law
Prize warfare
United States Supreme Court cases of the Rutledge Court